Polly Barton is an American textile artist.

Biography
She was born in New York City. As a student she studied art history at Barnard College (class of 1978) and has lived and traveled in Paris, Florence, and Rome. In 1981, she moved to Kameoka, Japan, to study with master weaver Tomohiko Inoue, living in the religious heart of the Oomoto Foundation. She returned to New York in 1982 and continued to weave on her Japanese tsumugi silk kimono looms.

A nationally recognized artist, she shows her woven silk ikat paintings on both coasts, and is collected by the Art Institute of Chicago, Museum of Fine Arts, Boston and by important private collectors. Her work has been published in numerous magazines including Hali Magazine, FiberArts, Surface Design Journal and American Craft. She is a member of the Textile Society of America, Friends of Fiber Arts International, the Surface Design Association and the Textile Arts Alliance of Santa Fe.

Exhibitions
2012:
New Woven Works, William Siegal Gallery, Santa Fe, New Mexico
San Francisco Art Fair, Linda Fairchild Contemporary Art, San Francisco, California
Sourcing the Museum, The Textile Museum, Washington, DC
New Works, Gail Martin, New York City

2011:
Sleight of Hand, Denver Art Museum, Denver, Colorado
Instructors Exhibition, Penland School of Crafts, Penland, North Carolina

2010:
New Work, William Siegal Gallery, Santa Fe
New Fibers 2010, Eastern Michigan University, Ypsilanti, Michigan
Transformed Traditions in Ikat, Modern Arts Midwest, Lincoln, Nebraska

2009	:
Origin, Shumei Arts Council, Pasadena, California

2008	:
Thread: Drawn, Dyed, Woven, William Siegal Gallery, Santa Fe
Visible Presence, San Jose Museum of Quilts and Textiles, San Jose, California
Woven Expressions, Gail Martin Gallery, New York City

2007	:
Saturn Returns: Back to the Future of Fiber Art, San Jose Museum of Quilts & Textiles, San Jose
Los Pintores: Past, Present, and Future, RSA along with FACT, Santa Fe
Then and Now, William Siegal Gallery, Santa Fe

2006:
Material Difference: Soft Sculpture and Wall Works, Chicago Cultural Center, Chicago, Illinois

2005	:
SOFA Chicago, Jane Sauer Gallery, Chicago

2004:
New Works, Linda Fairchild Gallery, San Francisco

2003	:
Opening Night, Linda Fairchild Gallery of Contemporary Art, San Francisco
SOFA New York, Gail Martin Gallery, New York City

2002	:
Threads on the Edge: The Daphne Farago Fiber Art Collection, Museum of Fine Arts, Boston, Massachusetts
Survey Fiber 2002, Snyderman-Works Galleries, Philadelphia, Pennsylvania

Public collections
Art Institute of Chicago, Chicago
Miho Museum, Misono, Japan
Boston Museum of Fine Arts, Boston
Daphne Farago Collection, Boston
Guido Goldman Ikat Collection, New York City
Davis, Polk & Wardwell, London, England and New York City
Tobin Collection, Santa Fe
Oomoto Foundation, Kameoka, Japan
Cathedral Church of St. John the Divine, New York City
Grace Cathedral, San Francisco
Church of the Heavenly Rest, New York City
Community Hospital Foundation of the Monterey Peninsula

Honors
1997 – Honorable Mention Crafts, Taos Open, Taos, New Mexico
1986 – Stanley Mendelbaum Award, Juried Exhibition of the New York Guild of Handweavers, New York City
1985 – Juror's Award, Juried Exhibition of the New York Guild of Handweavers, New York City
1984 – Best of Show Award, Convergence ’84, Dallas, Texas

Lectures and workshops
2009	 - Shumei, Crestone, Colorado
2008	 - William Siegal Gallery, Santa Fe
Visible Presence, San Jose Museum of Quilts and Textiles, San Jose
Textile Arts Alliance, Santa Fe
Shumei, Crestone
2004	 - Design with Heart, Santa Fe
2002	 - Boston Museum of Fine Arts, Boston
Textile Arts Alliance, Santa Fe
Summer Workshop: Ikat, Northern New Mexico Community College, El Rito, New Mexico
2001 – Summer Workshop: Ikat, Northern New Mexico Community College, El Rito

Education
2000–1993 – Northern New Mexico Community College, El Rito	
1984 – Parsons School of Design, New York City
1983–82 – Fashion Institute of Technology, New York City								
1981–82 – Kameoka, Japan, Apprentice to Master weaver Tomohiko Inoue				
1978 – Summer seminar, The Oomoto School of Traditional Japanese Arts, Kameoka, Japan
1978 – BA, Barnard College, New York City, magna cum laude

References

Further reading
Elder, E. Gaye. “Polly Barton: Painter of Silk Ikats”. Shuttle, Spindle, and Dyepot. Volume 41, No. 4, Spring 2010
Arney, Suzanne Smith. “Fiber Exhibitions by Polly Barton, Mary Anne Jordan, Eleanor McCain, and Mary Zicafoos”. Shuttle, Spindle, and Dyepot.
Vol. XXXIX, No. 4, Fall 2008, page 26–28.
Westfall, Carol. “Polly Barton: Woven Explorations”. Surface Design Journal. Volume 22, No. 1, Fall 2008. Page 60-61
Wykes, Sarah. “Rise of the Quilters”. San Jose Mercury News. December 9, 2007
“Then and Now”. Art News. Vol. 106, Summer 2007 Issue, page 209
Ullman, Polly. Material Difference and Soft Sculpture & Wall Works. Published by Friends of Fiber Art International
Heppenheimer, Jill. “Creativity at Midlife”. FiberArts. Vol. 32 No. 2, Sept/Oct. 2005, pages 46–51
Myers, Janice. “At Home with the Sacred”, Su Casa, Vol. 10 No. 3, Summer 2004, pages 68–75
SOFA New York, The Sixth Annual International Exposition of Sculpture Objects and Functional Art,
May 29-June 1, 2003, Catalogue page 77
Hoffman, Bruce. Survey Fiber 2002, Snyderman-Works Galleries, Catalogue page 4
Surface Design Journal, Summer 2001, Feature article
SOFA New York, The Sixth Annual International Exposition of Sculpture Objects and Functional Art,
May 31-June 4, 2001, Catalogue page 63
A Front Row Seat for SOFA, Special Advertising Supplement, Art & Auction, 2001, page 202
Zrebiec, Alice. “Polly Barton’s Ikat Paintings: Internal Harmony/External Epiphany”. Surface Design Journal,
Vol 25. No 4. Summer 2001, pages 36–41
Larochette, Jean Pierre and Lurie, Yael. “Thread by Thread”. American Tapestry Biennial III, 2000
HALI Magazine, Design File, Winter 2000
“Exposure”, Surface Design Journal, Vol 23, No 3, Spring 1999, page 42
Pasatiempo, Santa Fe New Mexican, Nov. 1994
Malarcher, Patricia. “Of One Cloth: Textiles of the Liturgical Arts”, Surface Design Journal, Vol 13, No.3. Spring 1989, pages 5–11
Malarcher, Patricia. The Liturgical Vestment: a Contemporary Overview, FiberArts, vol.11, No.5. Sept/Oct 1984, pages 58–61

Living people
Year of birth missing (living people)
20th-century American women artists
21st-century American women artists
American weavers
Artists from New York City
Barnard College alumni
Fashion Institute of Technology alumni
Parsons School of Design alumni
Women textile artists